SM U-100 was one of the 329 submarines serving in the Imperial German Navy in World War I. 
U-100 was engaged in the German campaign against Allied commerce (Handelskrieg) during that conflict.

U-100 was surrendered to the Allies at Harwich on 21 November 1918 in accordance with the requirements of the Armistice with Germany. After being exhibited at Blyth in December 1918, she was sold while lying there by the British Admiralty to George Cohen on 3 March 1919 for £2,250 (excluding her engines), and was broken up at Swansea. Her engines were sold to Southend Corporation for use in an electricity generating station.

Summary of raiding history

References

Notes

Citations

Bibliography

World War I submarines of Germany
Type U 57 submarines
Ships built in Bremen (state)
1917 ships
U-boats commissioned in 1917